James Hannah (17 March 1869 – 1 December 1917) was a Scottish footballer who played for Sunderland and the Scottish national football team as a winger.

Football career
Hannah signed for Sunderland Albion from Third Lanark, and thereafter moved to Sunderland where he made his debut on 3 October 1891 against Everton in a 2–1 win at Newcastle Road. He played for the Wearsiders between 1891 and 1897 and won English League championship medals in 1893 and 1895 (teammates included David Hannah, no relation). His goalscoring record in the FA Cup was noteworthy, as he scored 10 times in 16 games in the competition, including a hat-trick in Sunderland's record 11–1 win over Fairfield F.C. on 2 February 1895 in the first round. Overall in his spell at Sunderland, he played in 152 league games and scored 69 goals. After ending his time with Sunderland in the 1896–97 season he returned to Scotland to play for Third Lanark again, before returning south once more to play for Queen's Park Rangers.

While in his first spell with Third Lanark, Hannah made his sole Scotland appearance against Wales on 15 April 1889 in a 0–0 draw at The Racecourse Ground. After moving to England, he became ineligible under the Scottish Football Association's policy of the time which forbade England-based professionals from being selected. The rule was relaxed in 1896 and Hannah took part in the first Home Scots v Anglo-Scots trial match, but this did not lead to a recall for the full team. He made one representative appearance for the Football Alliance XI (the league in which Sunderland Albion played) in 1891.

Personal life
He married Isabella Potts in 1890 in Sunderland, and the couple produced four children, including Mary, Annie and James. His life after football was spent on Wearside, where he became licensee of the Smyrna Hotel. He thereafter worked for Messrs Reid & Co. for 15 years.

References

External links 
Jimmy Hannah's careers stats at The Stat Cat

1869 births
1917 deaths
Footballers from Glasgow
People from Gorbals
Scottish footballers
Scotland international footballers
Sunderland A.F.C. players
Third Lanark A.C. players
English Football League players
Scottish Football League players
Southern Football League players
Association football wingers
Sunderland Albion F.C. players
Queens Park Rangers F.C. players
Dykehead F.C. players
Football Alliance players